Yasumasa is a masculine Japanese given name.

Possible writings
Yasumasa can be written using many different combinations of kanji characters. Here are some examples:

康正, "healthy, righteous"
康雅, "healthy, elegant"
康政, "healthy, politics"
康昌, "healthy, clear"
康将, "healthy, commander"
靖正, "peaceful, righteous"
靖雅, "peaceful, elegant"
靖政, "peaceful, politics"
靖昌, "peaceful, clear"
靖将, "peaceful, commander"
安正, "tranquil, righteous"
安政, "tranquil, politics"
安昌, "tranquil, clear"
保正, "preserve, righteous"
保雅, "preserve, elegant"
保政, "preserve, politics"
泰正, "peaceful, righteous"
泰政, "peaceful, politics"
泰将, "peaceful, commander"
易正, "divination, righteous"
易真, "divination, reality"

The name can also be written in hiragana やすまさ or katakana ヤスマサ.

Notable people with the name
, Japanese general
, Japanese sport shooter
, Japanese Go player
, Japanese mathematician
, Japanese footballer
, Japanese bureaucrat
, Japanese artist
, Japanese politician
, Japanese footballer
, Japanese swimmer
, Japanese daimyō
, Japanese politician
, Japanese curler

Fictional characters
, a character in the novel Teito Monogatari

Japanese masculine given names